Uncrewed spaceflights to the International Space Station (ISS) are made primarily to deliver cargo, however several Russian modules have also docked to the outpost following uncrewed launches. Resupply missions typically use the Russian Progress spacecraft, European Automated Transfer Vehicles, Japanese Kounotori vehicles, and the American Dragon and Cygnus spacecraft. The primary docking system for Progress spacecraft is the automated Kurs system, with the manual TORU system as a backup. ATVs also use Kurs, however they are not equipped with TORU.  The other spacecraft — the Japanese HTV, the SpaceX Dragon (under CRS phase 1) and the Northrop Grumman Cygnus — rendezvous with the station before being grappled using Canadarm2 and berthed at the nadir port of the Harmony or Unity module for one to two months. Progress, Cygnus and ATV can remain docked for up to six months. Under CRS phase 2, Cargo Dragon docks autonomously at IDA-2 or 3 as the case may be. As of December 2022, Progress spacecraft have flown most of the uncrewed missions to the ISS.

To avoid confusion, this list includes Soyuz MS-23, which will launch uncrewed and land crewed, but does not include Soyuz MS-22, which was launched crewed and land uncrewed, which is listed at List of human spaceflights to the International Space Station.

Spaceports

Baikonur Cosmodrome
Baikonur Cosmodrome in Kazakhstan is the oldest and busiest spaceport. The first module of the ISS was launched from Baikonur Cosmodrome Site 81 as the uncrewed spacecraft Zarya in 1998 and flew uncrewed for about two years before the first crew arrived. The Progress spacecraft is the most frequent cargo ship sent from Baikonur to the station, bringing supplies such as food, fuel, gas, experiments, and parts. Its light payload is offset by its ability to deliver critical replacement parts at short notice. Fresh fruit and vegetables from the earth are an important part of the crew's diet.

Tanegashima Space Center

The name Kounotori was chosen for the HTV by JAXA because "a white stork carries an image of conveying an important thing (a baby, happiness, and other joyful things), therefore, it precisely expresses the HTV's mission to transport essential materials to the ISS".

Centre Spatial Guyanais
The European Space Agency (ESA) uses the Guiana Space Centre or, more commonly, Centre Spatial Guyanais (CSG). It is a French spaceport near Kourou in French Guiana. Operational since 1968, it is particularly suitable as a location for a spaceport due to its proximity to the equator, and that launches are in a favorable direction over water.

Cape Canaveral Space Force Station

Cape Canaveral Space Force Station, located in Florida, United States, has been operational since 1950; with its first orbital launch occurring in 1958. All of NASA's crewed Mercury and Gemini missions were launched from the Cape, along with some of the earlier Apollo missions. Cape Canaveral is adjacent to the Kennedy Space Center, where the majority of Apollo missions and all the Space Shuttle missions were launched from. Under contract with NASA, SpaceX launches the Dragon 2 Cargo variant spacecraft to resupply the American portion of the ISS. The Dragon can transport  of pressurized and unpressurized cargo and can return  to Earth. It is the only uncrewed resupply vehicle capable of returning a payload.

Mid-Atlantic Regional Spaceport
The Mid-Atlantic Regional Spaceport, located at Wallops Island, Virginia, United States, is the launch site for the Northrop Grumman Cygnus spacecraft for resupplying the American portion of the ISS.

Current and completed spaceflights

This is a list of uncrewed spaceflights to the International Space Station. Assembly flights are indicated in bold text.

Note: Russia has delivered cargo via the uncrewed missions of Progress since the launch of the ISS, while the U.S. had used Space Shuttles for hybrid human/cargo missions, resulting in a greater number of Russian uncrewed flights to the ISS. Since the discontinuation of the Space Shuttle program in 2011, the numbers of crewed and uncrewed flights by the U.S. and Russia are more closely matched.

For vehicles that are berthed to the station using the Space Station Remote Manipulator System (SSRMS) the times of berthing and unberthing are given. For those vehicles whose berthing and unberthing time is not sure is not provided, SSRMS capture and release is taken. This is because these vehicles remain physically attached to the station longer than indicated when counting the time between initial SSRMS capture and release. Formerly, the Japanese HTV and the SpaceX Dragon and currently, the Orbital Sciences Cygnus are the visiting vehicles to attach in this manner. For all other vehicles the times of docking and undocking are given.

Future spaceflights
Scheduled future flights are shown below:

See also

 List of spaceflights to the International Space Station
 List of human spaceflights to the International Space Station
 List of International Space Station spacewalks
 List of International Space Station visitors
 List of Progress flights
 Comparison of space station cargo vehicles
 Cargo spacecraft

External links
 NASA ISS Consolidated Launch Manifest
 ESA ISS Consolidated Launch Manifest
 SpaceX Launch Manifest
 Orbital Cygnus Launch Manifest
 Russian Launch Manifest

References

International Space Station uncrewed spaceflights
Flights to the International Space Station

ISS
2000s in spaceflight
2010s in spaceflight